Peter Edward Jarman was a Motorcycle speedway rider who started as a cycle speedway 'kid' in the 1950s and graduated to the motorised sport of speedway racing at training track Rye House, Herts.

Career
He was signed up for league racing in 1960 by Stoke Potters speedway team, racing in the newly formed Provincial League between 1960 and 1963. It was while he was at Stoke that he gained his first call-up to represent England in Test Matches. He gained two nicknames – 'Speedy Pete' and 'PLJ' (Pure Lemon Juice) Kid. When the Stoke Potters Speedway (and Greyhound) Stadium was sold for development at the end of 1963, Peter moved on to join  Wolverhampton Wolves in the 1964 pirate Provincial League, where he was their top scorer both in 1964 and, in 1965, in the new British League.  He later rode for Cradley Heathens and Oxford Rebels before ending his riding career with Eastbourne Eagles in 1977, where he doubled as coach.

He ran a Speedway School at Cowley Stadium in the mid-1970s. In the late 1970s he moved from his roots of South London to Poole and became the track curator at Poole Speedway for several years. He represented his country on three occasions. He was a popular, hard-working rider throughout his career. Peter Jarman died of non-Hodgkin lymphoma on 23 July 2007, aged 72 (not 75 as some sources quote), and his funeral was on 6 August in Poole. He had struggled with cancer over the previous ten years. He was survived by his wife, Ann, two sons and two daughters.

References

External links
Reg Fearman https://web.archive.org/web/20111008040805/http://www.world-sra.org.uk/Comrades%20%26%20Letters/berevement_Page.htm#Jarman Pete
http://wolverhampton-speedway.com/news.php?extend.208
http://www.potterspower.com/fearman/Foldpotters.htm
https://archive.today/20121223081137/http://www.cradleyspeedway.pwp.blueyonder.co.uk/riders/jarman.htm

British speedway riders
English motorcycle racers
Wolverhampton Wolves riders
Oxford Cheetahs riders
Cradley Heathens riders
Stoke Potters riders
Eastbourne Eagles riders
1935 births
2007 deaths